The 2005 NCAA Division I Women's Golf Championships were contested at the 24th annual NCAA-sanctioned golf tournament to determine the individual and team national champions of women's Division I collegiate golf in the United States.

The tournament was held at the Meadow Course at the Sunriver Resort in Sunriver, Oregon.

Duke won the team championship, the Blue Devils' third and first since 2002.

Anna Grzebien, also from Duke, won the individual title.

Qualification
Three regional qualifying tournaments were held across the United States from May 5–7, 2005.
The eight teams with the lowest team scores qualified from each of the regional tournaments.

^ Teams listed in qualifying order.

Results

Individual champion
 Anna Grzebien, Duke (286, +2)

Team leaderboard

 DC = Defending champion
 Debut appearance

References

NCAA Women's Golf Championship
Golf in Oregon
NCAA Women's Golf Championship
NCAA Women's Golf Championship
NCAA Women's Golf Championship